Magdalen Green railway station served the area of Magdalen Green, Dundee, Scotland from 1878 to 1956 on the Dundee and Perth Railway.

History 
The station opened on 1 June 1878 by the Dundee and Perth Railway. The station building was on the eastbound platform but there was no signal box until 1925. It closed to both passengers and goods traffic on 11 June 1956.

References

External links 

Disused railway stations in Dundee
Former Caledonian Railway stations
Railway stations in Great Britain opened in 1865
Railway stations in Great Britain closed in 1956
1865 establishments in Scotland
1956 disestablishments in Scotland